Chen Daoming (born 26 April 1955) is a Chinese actor who has starred in various genres of film and television series.

Career
Chen graduated from the Central Academy of Drama. His first notable role was "Puyi" (the last emperor of China) in the 1984 television series The Last Dynasty.
In 1990, he starred in CCTV's Fortress Besieged, a series that garnered the attention of the whole country in 1990 and established his status  as one of China's most popular stars. In 2000, he was awarded the Best Actor Huabiao Awards and the Golden Rooster Awards for his role in Huang Jianzhong's historical drama My 1919, which was about the signing of the Treaty of Versailles.
Chen is best known internationally for playing the King of Qin (who became Qin Shi Huang later) in the 2002 film Hero, directed by Zhang Yimou; as well as the tough undercover police detective in Infernal Affairs III. In 2014, Chen starred in Zhang Yimou's film Coming Home alongside Gong Li.

Personal life
In 1982, Chen married Du Xian, a former news anchor from China Central Television who was forced to resign for expressing sympathy (dressing in black and speaking slowly) when she reported the Tiananmen Square protests of 1989 on 4 June 1989. Their daughter was born in 1985.

Filmography

Film

Television series

Awards and nominations

References

External links

 

1955 births
Living people
Chinese male film actors
Chinese male television actors
21st-century Chinese male actors
Male actors from Tianjin
20th-century Chinese male actors
Asia Pacific Screen Award winners
Members of the 12th Chinese People's Political Consultative Conference
Members of the 11th Chinese People's Political Consultative Conference
Members of the 10th Chinese People's Political Consultative Conference